The Tony Award for Best Newcomer was an honor presented at the Tony Awards, a ceremony established in 1947 as the Antoinette Perry Awards for Excellence in Theatre. The award was given to actors and actresses for quality debut roles in a Broadway play or musical. It was presented only once, to two performers, in 1948.

Winners and nominees

1940s

See also
 Laurence Olivier Award for Best Newcomer in a Play

References

External links
 Tony Awards Official site
 Tony Awards at Internet Broadway database Listing
 Tony Awards at broadwayworld.com

Tony Awards
Awards established in 1948
1948 establishments in the United States